The Taiwan Statebuilding Party (TSP) is a political party in Taiwan. The party was established in 2016 as Taiwan Radical Wings. The party is considered a close ally of the Democratic Progressive Party.

History 
As of 2018, the chairperson was Chen Yi-chi.

In the 2020 legislative elections in Taiwan, the party won one seat, with Chen Po-wei becoming its first member of the Legislative Yuan.

In October 2021, Chen became the first member of the Legislative Yuan to be successfully recalled, ending his term less than two years into office. Votes for Chen's recall numbered 77,899, against 73,433 opposing his recall. Votes supporting the recall topped 25% of the eligible electorate (73,744), with 51.72 percent voter turnout. On 28 October 2021, he was officially dismissed from the Legislative Yuan.

Policies
TSP was once described as a left-wing, progressive and pro-independence party.

Structure

Chair
 Current Chair: Chen Yi-chi (since May 2016)

Secretary-General
 Current Secretary-General: Wang Hsing-huan (since September 2021)

Election results

Legislative elections
{| class="wikitable"
|+
!Election
!Total seats won
!Total votes
!Share of votes
!Changes
!Party leader
!Status
!President
|-
!2020
|
|447,286
|3.16%
| 1 seats
|Chen Yi-chi
|
|Tsai Ing-wen 
|}

Local elections

References

External links

 
 
Political parties established in 2016
Taiwanese nationalist political parties
Pro-independence parties
Feminist parties
Anti-communist parties
Left-wing nationalist parties
Progressive parties in Taiwan
Identity politics in Taiwan
Radical parties
Taiwan independence movement